Yog Nagari Rishikesh railway station is a newly built railway station serving the city of Rishikesh in the Indian state of Uttarakhand. It lies in the Northern railway network zone of Indian Railways. The station code is YNRK.

History 
The Rishikesh–Karnaprayag line is a new railline runs from Yog Nagari Rishikesh railway station in Rishikesh to Karnaprayag. It is Indian Railways' proposed route for the Char Dham Railway to connect to the Chota Char Dham.

Location
The railway station is located in Rishikesh in Dehradun District, Uttarakhand, India.

Signage
The station signage is predominantly in English, Hindi and Sanskrit.

Train
Indian railways had extended few trains to the station. 

 Kalinga Utkal Festival Special
 Yoga Express
 Yog Nagari Rishikesh–Prayagraj Sangam Express
 Yog Nagari Rishikesh–Jammu Tawi Express
 Udaipur City–Yog Nagari Rishikesh Express
 Doon Express

See also
 Rishikesh railway station
 Rishikesh–Karnaprayag line

References

Railway stations in Dehradun district
Moradabad railway division
Transport in Rishikesh